Cyclododecane is an organic compound with the chemical formula (CH2)12. It is a waxy white solid at room temperature, and is soluble in nonpolar organic solvents.  

It is an intermediate of Nylon 12, polyesters, and synthetic lubricating oils. It is also used as a temporary binder to stabilise fragile objects or to seal water-sensitive parts; it slowly sublimates over days or weeks without leaving any residue.

Uses
It is a precursor to laurolactam, a precursor to the polymer Nylon 12.

Cyclododecane is also an intermediate in production of flame retardants, detergents, and other chemicals. 

Cyclododecane is also used as a volatile binding medium, a temporary binder for sealing and conservation of friable and structurally weak materials, e.g. during excavation and transport of archaeological objects and in art restoration, e.g. to protect water-sensitive parts during cleaning. Due to its relatively slow evaporation in comparison with other volatile binding mediums the layer can last for several weeks. Very pure material has to be used so it does not leave any residue. Cyclododecane can be applied in molten state or dissolved in a nonpolar organic solvent. Other volatile binding mediums in use are camphene, tricyclene and with some limits menthol.

Environmental considerations
Cyclododecane is persistent in the environment, as it does not biodegrade easily. Cyclododecane is lipophilic, usually present in the environment as adsorbed on the surface of soil particles. It has the potential to bioaccumulate. Cyclododecane may cause long lasting harmful effects to aquatic life.

References

External links

Cycloalkanes
Methods in archaeology
Conservation and restoration materials